Gustav Andersson i Löbbo  (27 January 1890 – 2 August 1962) was a Swedish politician. He was a member of the Centre Party.

Centre Party (Sweden) politicians
1890 births
1962 deaths
Members of the Andra kammaren
20th-century Swedish politicians